A somatic mutation is a change in the DNA sequence of a somatic cell of a multicellular organism with dedicated reproductive cells; that is, any mutation that occurs in a cell other than a gamete, germ cell, or gametocyte. Unlike germline mutations, which can be passed on to the descendants of an organism, somatic mutations are not usually transmitted to descendants. This distinction is blurred in plants, which lack a dedicated germline, and in those animals that can reproduce asexually through mechanisms such as budding, as in members of the cnidarian genus Hydra.

While somatic mutations are not passed down to an organism's offspring, somatic mutations will be present in all descendants of a cell within the same organism. Many cancers are the result of accumulated somatic mutations.

Fraction of cells affected 
The term somatic generally refers to the cells of the body, in contrast to the reproductive (germline) cells, which give rise to the egg or sperm.  For example, in mammals, somatic cells make up all the internal organs, skin, bones, blood and connective tissue. There are approximately 220 types of somatic cells in the human body.

In most animals, separation of germ cells from somatic cells (germline development) occurs during early stages of development. Once this segregation has occurred in the embryo, any mutation outside of the germline cells can not be passed down to an organism's offspring. However, somatic mutations are passed down to all the progeny of a mutated cell within the same organism. A major section of an organism therefore might carry the same mutation, especially if that mutation occurs at earlier stages of development. Somatic mutations that occur later in an organism's life can be hard to detect, as they may affect only a single cell - for instance, a post-mitotic neuron; improvements in single cell sequencing are therefore an important tool for the study of somatic mutation. Both the nuclear DNA and mitochondrial DNA of a cell can accumulate mutations; somatic mitochondrial mutations have been implicated in development of some neurodegenerative diseases.

Exceptions to inheritance 

The definition of a somatic mutation as any mutation that cannot be passed down to offspring is useful in animals that have a dedicated germline to produce reproductive cells. However, it is of little value in understanding the inheritance of somatic mutation in multicellular organisms that do not designate germ cells in early development. Plants and basal animals such as sponges and corals do not have a germline; instead they generate gametes from pluripotent stem cells in adult somatic tissues. In flowering plants, for example, germ cells can arise from adult somatic cells in the floral meristem. Other animals without a designated germ line include tunicates and flatworms.

This distinction is also blurred in organisms that can reproduce asexually, without production of gametes. For instance, animals in the cnidarian genus Hydra can reproduce asexually through the mechanism of budding (they can also reproduce sexually). In hydra, a new bud develops directly from somatic cells of the parent hydra. A mutation present in the tissue that gives rise to the daughter organism would be passed down to that offspring.

Many plants naturally reproduce through vegetative reproduction - growth of a new plant from a fragment of the parent plant -  propagating somatic mutations without the step of seed production. Humans artificially induce vegetative reproduction via grafting and stem cuttings.

Causes 

As with germline mutations, mutations in somatic cells may arise due to endogenous factors, including errors during DNA replication and repair, and exposure to reactive oxygen species produced by normal cellular processes. Mutations can also be induced by contact with mutagens, which can increase the rate of mutation.

Most mutagens act by causing DNA damage - alterations in DNA structure such as pyrimidine dimers, or breakage of one or both DNA strands. DNA repair processes can remove DNA damages that would, otherwise, upon DNA replication, cause mutation. Mutation results from damage when mistakes in the mechanism of DNA repair causes a change in nucleotide sequence, or if replication occurs before repair is complete.

Mutagens can be physical, such as radiation from UV rays and X-rays, or chemical - molecules that interact directly with DNA - such as metabolites of benzo[a]pyrene, a potent carcinogen found in tobacco smoke. Mutagens associated with cancers are often studied to learn about cancer and its prevention.

Mutation frequency 

Research suggests that the frequency of mutations is generally higher in somatic cells than in cells of the germline; furthermore, there are differences in the types of mutation seen in the germ and in the soma. There is variation in mutation frequency between different somatic tissues within the same organism and between species.

Milholland et al. (2017) examined the mutation rate of dermal fibroblasts (a type of somatic cell) and germline cells in humans and in mice. They measured the rate of single nucleotide variants (SNVs), most of which are a consequence of replication error. Both in terms of mutational load (total mutations present in a cell) and mutation rate per cell division (new mutations with each mitosis), somatic mutation rates were more than ten times that of the germline, in humans and in mice.

In humans, mutation load in fibroblasts was over twenty times greater than germline (2.8 × 10−7 compared with 1.2 × 10−8 mutations per base pair). Adjusted for differences in the estimated number of cell divisions, the fibroblast mutation rate was about 80 times greater than the germ (respectively, 2.66 × 10−9  vs. 3.3 × 10−11 mutations per base pair per mitosis).

The disparity in mutation rate between the germline and somatic tissues likely reflects the greater importance of genetic integrity in the germline than in the soma. Variation in mutation frequency may be due to differences in rates of DNA damage or to differences in the DNA repair process as a result of elevated levels of DNA repair enzymes.

In April 2022 it has been reported that most mammals have about the same number of mutations by the time they reach the end of their lifespan, so those that have similar lifespan will have similar somatic mutation rates and those who live less/more will have a higher/lower rate of somatic mutations respectively.

Somatic hypermutation 

As a part of the adaptive immune response, antibody-producing B cells experience a mutation rate many times higher than the normal rate of mutation. The mutation rate in  antigen-binding coding sequences of the immunoglobulin genes is up to 1,000,000 times higher than in cell lines outside the lymphoid system. A major step in affinity maturation, somatic hypermutation helps B cells produce antibodies with greater antigen affinity.

Disease 
Somatic mutations accumulate within an organism's cells as it ages and with each round of cell division; the role of somatic mutations in the development of cancer is well established, and is implicated in the biology of aging.

Mutations in neuronal stem cells (especially during neurogenesis) and in post-mitotic neurons lead to genomic heterogeneity of neurons - referred to as "somatic brain mosaicism". The accumulation of age-related mutations in neurons may be linked to neurodegenerative diseases, including Alzheimer's disease, but the association is unproven. The majority of central-nervous system cells in the adult are post-mitotic, and adult mutations might affect only a single neuron. Unlike in cancer, where mutations result in clonal proliferation, detrimental somatic mutations might contribute to neurodegenerative disease by cell death. Accurate assessment of somatic mutation burden in neurons therefore remains difficult to assess.

Role in carcinogenesis 

If a mutation occurs in a somatic cell of an organism, it will be present in all descendants of this cell within the same organism. The accumulation of certain mutations over generations of somatic cells is part of the process of malignant transformation, from normal cell to cancer cell.

Cells with heterozygous loss-of-function mutations (one good copy of a gene and one mutated copy) may function normally with the unmutated copy until the good copy has been spontaneously somatically mutated. This kind of mutation happens often in living organisms, but it is difficult to measure the rate. Measuring this rate is important in predicting the rate at which people may develop cancer.

See also 

 Mosaic (genetics)
 Human somatic variation

References 

DNA
Genetics
Mutation